Bob van Dijk (born 1972) is a Dutch businessman, and the CEO of Naspers since April 2014.

He previously was the CEO of the Allegro division. Before working for Naspers, he worked for eBay. He began his business career as an associate at McKinsey & Company. He holds an MBA from INSEAD, and an MSc in econometrics from Erasmus University Rotterdam.

References

1972 births
Living people
Dutch chief executives in the media industry
Erasmus University Rotterdam alumni
INSEAD alumni
People from Helmond